Mónica Beatriz Zalaquett Said (born May 4, 1962 in Santiago, Chile) is a Chilean business and political communicator.

She currently serves as Minister of Women and Gender Equity under the second government of Sebastián Piñera since June 9, 2020, replacing Macarena Santelices. 

Between 2010 and 2014 she was a deputy of the district N ° 20 by the Independent Democratic Union (UDI).

Education 
She has degrees in journalism studies from the Bolivian Catholic University and political science from Universidad de Los Andes and Universidad del Desarrollo. She also has a Diploma in Management for Political Campaign from the American University of the United States.

Political career 
She has been a member of the Independent Democratic Union (UDI) since 2000.  That same year, she worked in the campaign of Pablo Zalaquett, who was elected mayor of the Municipality of Florida and in 2005 was part of the command of Pablo Longueira, who was elected senator for Santiago Oriente.

Personal life  
She is the daughter of the Chilean with Lebanese descent Antonio Zalaquett and the Peruvian of Palestinian descent Beatriz Said. Her brother is the former mayor of Santiago, Pablo Zalaquett. 

She is married to Bolivian businessman Dieter Garafulic and is the mother of four children: Nicole, Diego, Tomás and Matías.

References

External links 

 

1962 births
Living people
Ministers of Women and Gender Equality of Chile
Bolivian Catholic University San Pablo alumni
University of the Andes, Chile alumni
University for Development alumni
American University alumni
Independent Democratic Union politicians
People from Santiago
Women government ministers of Chile
21st-century Chilean politicians
21st-century Chilean women politicians
Chilean people of Lebanese descent
Chilean people of Peruvian descent
Chilean people of Palestinian descent
Members of the Chamber of Deputies of Chile
Women members of the Chamber of Deputies of Chile
Chilean anti-abortion activists